Nathan Adam Sobey (born 14 July 1990) is an Australian professional basketball player for the Brisbane Bullets of the National Basketball League (NBL). He played college basketball for the University of Wyoming's Cowboys. He was a member of the Australian Boomers team that won bronze at the 2020 Tokyo Olympics.

Early life
Sobey was born in Warrnambool, Victoria. He attended Emmanuel College in Warrnambool and St Patrick's College in Ballarat. He is listed by Emmanuel College as being a member of their Class of 2008, but sources also indicate he attended and represented St Patrick's College in 2008. In 2010, he played for the Warrnambool Seahawks in the Big V Division One.

College career
Sobey moved to the United States in 2010 to play college basketball for Cochise College. During his freshman season, he averaged 7.9 points, 2.9 rebounds and 1.2 assists. As a sophomore in 2011–12, Sobey averaged 16.5 points, 6.9 rebounds, 2.5 assists and 1.8 steals per game. He earned First-Team All-Conference and First-Team All-Region honors.

In April 2012, Sobey signed a National Letter of Intent to play for Wyoming in the NCAA Division I.

As a junior in 2012–13, Sobey appeared in 32 games for the Cowboys and averaged 3.5 points and 1.0 rebounds in 13.3 minutes per game. On 26 February 2013 against Air Force, he scored a season-high 22 points in a career-high 31 minutes.

As a senior in 2013–14, Sobey was one of two Cowboys to start all 33 games. He averaged 9.8 points, 3.4 rebounds and 1.9 assists in 30.2 minutes per game. He scored a career-high 33 points to go with four rebounds and three assists against Colorado State on 8 March 2014.

Professional career
Sobey joined the Ballarat Miners of the semi-pro South East Australian Basketball League (SEABL), the 2nd-tier level club league in Australia, in 2014. He began his full professional career in the 2014–15 season, with the Cairns Taipans of Australia's top-tier level National Basketball League (NBL). He then moved to the Australian club, the Adelaide 36ers, after he signed a 3 year contract with the them.

He then spent the 2015–16 and 2016–17 seasons with Adelaide. In the 2016–17 NBL season, with the 36ers, he averaged 15.5 points, 5.1 rebounds, 4.1 assists, and 1.0 steals per game. He was named the NBL's Most Improved Player in 2017. He was also named to the All-NBL Second Team that season.

In 2016, Sobey led the Warrnambool Seahawks to the Big V Division One championship. He was named league MVP and Finals MVP, and led the league in both points (31ppg) and assists (6apg). He played for the Seahawks again in 2018.

He joined Greek Basket League club PAOK in March 2017. He extended his contract with the Adelaide 36ers for another two years in April 2017.

Sobey was invited to the Utah Jazz's free agent mini camp in June 2017, and his performance impressed the team's coaching staff. He then signed to play with the Jazz's summer league team at the 2017 NBA Summer League.

On 5 April 2019, Sobey signed with the Brisbane Bullets on a three-year deal.

On 27 April 2022, Sobey re-signed with the Bullets on a three-year deal.

National team career
In 2018, Sobey won gold with the Australian Boomers at the Commonwealth Games. The following year he played for the Boomers at the FIBA World Cup.

At the 2019 Australian Basketball Hall of Fame awards night, Sobey was recognised alongside Nick Kay with the 2019 Gaze Family Medal for performances at the World Cup Qualifiers and the Commonwealth Games.

In February 2021, Sobey was named in the Boomers' Olympic squad. He went on to help the Boomers win the bronze medal.

Personal life
Sobey has two brothers. Sobey was married in 2018.

References

External links
FIBA profile (game center)
Greek Basket League profile 
Greek Basket League profile 
Adelaide 36ers profile 
Wyoming Cowboys bio
"Consistently Improving: Sobey’s Remarkable Rise to Stardom" at nbl.com.au

1990 births
Living people
Adelaide 36ers players
Australian expatriate basketball people in France
Australian expatriate basketball people in Greece
Australian expatriate basketball people in the United States
Australian men's basketball players
Basketball players at the 2018 Commonwealth Games
Basketball players at the 2020 Summer Olympics
Brisbane Bullets players
Cairns Taipans players
Commonwealth Games gold medallists for Australia
Commonwealth Games medallists in basketball
Junior college men's basketball players in the United States
Medalists at the 2020 Summer Olympics
Olympic basketball players of Australia
Olympic bronze medalists for Australia
Olympic medalists in basketball
P.A.O.K. BC players
Point guards
Shooting guards
SIG Basket players
Small forwards
Wyoming Cowboys basketball players
2019 FIBA Basketball World Cup players
Cochise Apaches men's basketball players
Medallists at the 2018 Commonwealth Games